Cape Levenshtern (Russian: Mys Levenshterna) is a cape on the northeast coast of Sakhalin Island in the western Sea of Okhotsk. It is rounded and rugged. It lies 37 km (about 23 mi) to the south-southeast of Cape Elizabeth, the northern point of the island.

History

On the night of 7 June 1855, the ship Jefferson (396 tons), of New London, was wrecked on the cape during a dense fog. All hands were saved by the ship Reindeer, of New Bedford, which also salvaged most of the cargo of oil and bone.

References

Levenshtern
Shipwrecks in the Sea of Okhotsk